Omoglymmius seriatus is a species of beetle in the subfamily Rhysodinae. It was described by R.T. Bell & J.R. Bell in 1988. It is known from Mount Tambusisi in Central Sulawesi (Indonesia), near the Gulf of Tomini.

Omoglymmius seriatus holotype, a female, measures  in length and was collected from under bark of a tree.

Notes

References

seriatus
Beetles of Indonesia
Endemic fauna of Indonesia
Fauna of Sulawesi
Beetles described in 1988